The Huizhou dialect is a Chinese dialect spoken in and around Huicheng District, the traditional urban centre of Huizhou, Guangdong. The locals also call the dialect Bendihua and distinguish it from the dialect spoken in Meixian and Danshui, Huiyang, which they call Hakka.

Classification
The classification of the Huizhou dialect is disputed because it shows characteristics of both Yue and Hakka. Most scholars classify the Huizhou dialect as a dialect of Hakka, but some scholars, most notably Liu Shuxin, consider it to be a dialect of Yue.

The first edition of the Language Atlas of China puts it into its own subgroup under Hakka known as the Huizhou subgroup. In the second edition, it is still classified as a dialect of Hakka, but it is placed under the Mei–Hui cluster of the Yue–Tai subgroup.

Liu Shuxin groups it together with other similar dialects spoken around the middle and upper reaches of the Dong River, including the Heyuan dialect, into the Hui–He branch of Yue. Chang Song-hing and Zhuang Chusheng propose a similar grouping called the Hui–He subgroup, but they classify the group as Hakka.

Phonology

Tones
The Huizhou dialect has seven tones:

Other than these seven tones,  (55) appears in some grammatical particles.

Grammar

Verbal aspect
The Huizhou dialect has several aspectual markers that attach to the verb as suffixes:

Pronouns
The Huizhou dialect has the following personal pronouns. The plural is formed by a tone change.

Vocabulary

The Huizhou dialect has many cognates with Yue and/or Hakka (cognates with Huizhou are shaded in blue):

Notes

References
 
 
 
 
 
 
 
 
 
 
 
 

Hakka Chinese
Yue Chinese
Huizhou